This is a list of weapons used by the Spanish Army, one of the world's oldest armies, with its history dating back to the 16th century.

Spanish-American War 

 List of weapons of the Spanish–American War

Spanish Civil War 

 List of Spanish Civil War weapons of the Nationalists
 List of Spanish Civil War weapons of the Republicans

World War II 
Spain remained neutral in World War II 
 List of World War II weapons of Spain

Cold War 

 List of Cold War weapons and land equipment of Spain

Present 

 Spanish Army

References

Weapons of Spain